Lenka Ledvinová (born 11 August 1985 in Domažlice) is a hammer thrower from the Czech Republic.

She finished sixth at the 2004 World Junior Championships and won the silver medal at the 2007 Summer Universiade. She also competed at the 2002 European Championships, the 2006 European Championships, the 2007 World Championships and the 2008 Olympic Games without reaching the final.

Ledvinová has improved Czech national record thrice since July 2008. Her personal best throw is 70.51 metres, achieved in May 2009 in Sušice.

Competition record

References

1985 births
Living people
Czech female hammer throwers
Athletes (track and field) at the 2008 Summer Olympics
Olympic athletes of the Czech Republic
Universiade medalists in athletics (track and field)
Universiade bronze medalists for the Czech Republic
Competitors at the 2009 Summer Universiade
Medalists at the 2007 Summer Universiade
People from Domažlice
Sportspeople from the Plzeň Region
21st-century Czech women